50 meter rifle three positions (formerly known as one of four free rifle disciplines) is an International Shooting Sport Federation event, a miniature version of 300 meter rifle three positions. It consists of the kneeling, prone, and standing positions, fired in that order, traditionally with 3×40 shots for men and 3×20 shots for women. In January 2018, the number of shots was equalised between genders with the Women's 3x20 being abolished in favour of a 3x40 match identical to the men's event. The caliber is .22 Long Rifle (5.6 mm).

In both the men's and women's event, athletes must complete the course of fire within a single time block of 2 hours, 45 minutes. Before January 2018, the Women's 3x20 event had a time limit of 1 hour, 45 minutes. These time limits are applicable to matches conducted using electronic targets; longer times are used if the slower manual scoring system is used. This was the only remaining difference between men's and women's equipment after the switch from standard rifles to sport rifles. This rendered the men's and women's events identical in both number of shots and equipment permitted.

In major competitions, including World Cups and World Championships, the top eight competitors reach a finals match, where the medal positions are decided. Beginning in 2013, a new finals format was instituted, in which the qualification score is discarded, and the standings among the top eight shooters are determined by their finals scores alone. The course of fire was also changed significantly with the new rules, from the previous 10-shot program in only the standing position, into a 45-shot elimination format in all three positions. After 10 of the 15 shots of the final, standing stage, the two lowest-ranked shooters are eliminated. For the remaining five shots, the lowest-ranked shooter is eliminated after each shot, before the final shot decides the gold and silver medalists among the final two survivors.

World Championships, Men

World Championships, Men Team

World Championships, Women

World Championships, Women Team

Current world records

References

ISSF shooting events
Rifle shooting sports